A Best 2 (stylized as  BEST 2) is a series of greatest hits albums by Japanese singer Ayumi Hamasaki, which were released simultaneously on  by Avex Trax. The two-volume release is a direct successor to A Best (2001) and features material from a four-year period of her career. A Best 2 is split between contrasting "dark" and "light" themes, with the two volumes Black and White compiling songs of either nature, respectively.

A Best 2 held the top two spots of the Oricon albums chart in its debuting week, with A Best 2: White at number one. This made Hamasaki the first female artist since Keiko Fuji to occupy both positions in 37 years. Both A Best 2 volumes were certified 3× Platinum by the Recording Industry Association of Japan.

A Best 2: Black
A Best 2: Black includes a previously unreleased track, "Part of Me" (featured in a new Panasonic CM) and its accompanying music video. The song was certified gold for 100,000 legal downloads.

Track listing

DVD track listing
1st DVD – Promotional Videos
 "Dearest"
 "Carols"
 "No Way to Say"
 "Walking Proud"
 "Free & Easy"
 "Endless Sorrow"
 "Because of You"
 "About You"
 "Game"
 "Is This Love?"
 "Hanabi: Episode II"
 "Never Ever" [promotional clip]
 "Heaven"
 "Part of Me"
 "H" [TV-CM]

2nd DVD – Best of CountDown Live 2006–2007
Best of CountDown Live 2006–2007 (Behind the Scenes) (90 minutes)

Charts
Oricon Sales Chart (Japan)

  Total Sales :  970,000 (Japan)

A Best 2: White
On January 15, 2007, A Best 2 was confirmed on Hamasaki's official website. On January 16, the track listing for both CDs were officially released. The album covers and DVD track listings were released on February 6.

Track listing

DVD track listing
1st DVD – Promotional Videos
"Evolution"
"Grateful Days"
"Humming 7/4"
"Unite!" [promotional clip]
"Real me"
"My Name's Women"
"Ourselves"
"Inspire"
"Step you"
"Fairyland"
"Voyage"
"Moments"
"H" [TV-CM]

2nd DVD – Best of CountDown Live 2006–2007
"Not Yet"
"Ourselves"
"Fly High"
"Beautiful Fighters"
"Never Ever"
"A Song for" ××
"No Way to Say"
"Free & Easy"
"Evolution"
"Flower Garden"
"Until That Day..."
"Audience"
"Boys & Girls"

-encore-
"Trauma"
"Independent"
"Humming 7/4"
"Blue Bird"

Charts
A Best 2: White – Oricon Sales Chart (Japan)

  Total Sales :  990,000 (Japan)

Release history

Sales and accomplishments

Japan
After the first week sales of A Best 2: Black and White were announced, Hamasaki had already garnered sales of over 1 million copies. With the release of A Best 2, Hamasaki also broke many records.

As of August 2007, A Best 2 has charted in the top 5 of 2007 Oricon Half-Yearly Album 2007 Chart. A Best: White charted as #3 and Black charted as #4; the nearest competitor was Kobukuro with "All Singles Best" with sales around 640,000 copies. However, factoring in consistent sales of Kobukuro's "All Singles Best", it is predicted that A Best 2 will fall down to #4 and #5, respectively. According to Avex, A Best 2 had sold over 2 million copies as of March 2007.

Oricon Sales Chart (Japan)

 Total sales: 1,960,000 (Japan)
 Total sales: 2,000,000 (Avex)

Featured singles

Total single sales: 10,703,000

Live performances
 – Music Station – "Evolution"
 – Music Fair 21 – "Evolution", "Dearest", "Heaven"
 – Hey! Hey! Hey! – "Dearest"
 – SMAPxSMAP – "Voyage", "Unite!"
 – Music Station – "Part of Me"
 – Music Fighter – "Never Ever"
 – PopJam – "Moments"
 – Domoto Kyoudai – "Step You"
 – Music Station – "Memorial Address"
 – PopJam (final episode special) – "No Way to Say"

References

External links
 Information about A BEST 2 on Ayumi Hamasaki's website
 g-music charts
 Korea monthly charts

2007 greatest hits albums
Ayumi Hamasaki compilation albums
Avex Group compilation albums
Japanese-language albums